Service NSW is a New South Wales Government executive agency within the Department of Customer Service that provides a one-stop access to government services via online, phone or in-person at its service centres. The agency is the single point of contact point for a number of New South Wales government agencies including Transport for NSW, Fair Trading NSW and Births, Deaths and Marriages, and provides services such as the application for licences and permits, registration of births and payment of fines.

As of February 2023, there are 114 Service NSW centres across the state.

History
Development of Service NSW commenced in July 2012, with the appointment of Michael Pratt as Customer Service Commissioner. Over the next year, organisational structure and business processes were developed, and executive team and staff were recruited. The organisation was officially created as a separate agency on 18 March 2013 within the Department of Premier and Cabinet cluster, but it was non-operating until assets, staff and liabilities were transferred from the DPC on 14 June 2013. In April 2013, a "concept store" was opened for testing.

In July 2013, its website and a round-the-clock telephone service were launched, and its inaugural Kiama service centre opened on 5 July 2013. Service NSW offices replaced Roads & Maritime Services offices in New South Wales.  They provide additional services in multiple locations that were previously only available in the Sydney central business district and at certain regional locations.

On 1 July 2014, Service NSW was transferred to the Treasury and Finance cluster. The Treasury and Finance cluster was replaced by the Finance, Services and Innovation cluster on 1 July 2015, which was replaced by the customer service cluster on 1 July 2019.

Chief executive officers
Service NSW is led by its chief executive officer, presently Greg Wells, who reports to the Minister for Customer Service, presently Victor Dominello.

 Glenn King (2012–15)
 Rachna Gandhi (2015–17)
 Damon Rees (2017–2022)
 Greg Wells (2022-Present)

References

Government agencies of New South Wales
Public services
2013 establishments in Australia